is a non-fiction novel written by Japanese author Narumi Komatsu, published on 1 August 2019, by Gentosha.

The novel is based on the biography of Japanese singer Ayumi Hamasaki from the period prior to her major debut as a singer, until the early 2000s, particularly on the aspects regarding Hamasaki's relationship with her executive producer, Max Matsuura.

The novel was a commercial success in Japan, selling 38,000 copies in its first week of release according to Oricon.

TV drama 

The novel was adapted to a TV drama by TV Asahi and AbemaTV, with the first episode airing in April 2020. As a result of difficulties regarding filming during the COVID-19 pandemic, the story was shortened to only seven episodes.

Plot 
Set in the 1990s, Ayu is a high school student aiming to pursue a career in the entertainment business. Living her childhood with her mother and grandmother in Fukuoka, while still being a teenager she decides to move to the capital Tokyo to live with her aunt. Ayu begins her modelling and acting career in a small talent agency and drops out of high school. However, her career does not seem to advance, as she only gets minor roles in B rate productions. One day, Ayu meets Masa, who is the executive director of record label A Victory. He decides take Ayu as his protégé, taking full responsibility of every aspect of her career in order to turn her into a successful singer. Ayu begins taking singing lessons, first in New York, and then in the A Victory academy, where she encounters difficulties and jealously by her classmates. On the other hand, Masa is continuously trying to prove himself against Director Ohama, renowned producer Tenmei Kira, and label associate Shō Rukawa. However, before Ayu's official debut with A Victory, her grandmother is taken back to be hospitalized in Fukuoka and later dies.

Differences from original novel 
There are characters that were specifically created for this adaptation, such as Shō Rukawa and Reika Himeno. Additionally, several real names were changed for this adaptation, such as the record label, A Victory (based on Avex Trax), as well as names of other contemporary artists such as Tenmei Kira (inspired by Tetsuya Komuro), USG (inspired by TRF), Over The Fact (inspired by Every Little Thing), or AXEL's (inspired by MAX). Hamasaki and Matsuura's real names are never mentioned in the drama; they are always referred to as merely Ayu and Masa. Hamasaki's time with Nippon Columbia was completely omitted from the drama.

Cast 
Kalen Anzai - Ayu
Shohei Miura - Masa
Alan Shirahama - Shō Rukawa
Minami Tanaka - Reika Himeno
Masanobu Takashima - Ohama
Katsunori Takahashi - Nakatani
Sayu Kubota - Risa Tamaki
Mayuko Kawakita - Mika Nojima
Michiko Tanaka - Asuka Yoshida
Shinya Niiro - Tenmei Kira
Yoshie Ichige - Sachiko
Ayaka Den - Mari Nishitani
Natsuhi Ueno - Satomi Shiina
Kenta Mizue - Naoki Sayama
Miki Mizuno - Mayumi Tenma

Spin-off series 
A spin-off of the series based on the character of Reika Himeno, entitled , premiered on the AbemaTV streaming service on 27 June 2020.

References 

2019 Japanese novels
Japanese romance novels
2020 Japanese television series debuts
Japanese drama television series
Japanese romance television series
Gentosha